Beta Island is a small island which lies immediately north of Kappa Island and close southwest of Alpha Island in the Melchior Islands, Palmer Archipelago. The name, derived from the second letter of the Greek alphabet, was probably given by Discovery Investigations personnel who roughly surveyed the island in 1927. The island was also surveyed by Argentine expeditions in 1942, 1943 and 1948.

See also 
 List of Antarctic and sub-Antarctic islands

References
 

Islands of the Palmer Archipelago